is a Japanese speed skater. She competed in two events at the 1972 Winter Olympics.

References

External links
 

1950 births
Living people
Japanese female speed skaters
Olympic speed skaters of Japan
Speed skaters at the 1972 Winter Olympics
Sportspeople from Nagano Prefecture